Gladestry is a small village and community in Radnorshire, Powys, mid-Wales, close to the border with England at the end of the Hergest Ridge and south of the large moorland area of Radnor Forest. People living in Gladestry rely on the nearby town of Kington, Herefordshire, for shops, employment, and public services.  

The village is part of a thriving farming and agricultural community, and a local quarry. The village comprises a parish church, the Royal Oak pub, a primary school which educates around 50–60 children and a village hall. In the 2001 census the population of the community was 419, reducing slightly to 412 at the 2011 Census.
The community includes Newchurch and Michaelchurch-on-Arrow.

Offa's Dyke
Offa's Dyke Path passes through the village and there are various footpaths and bridleways for walkers, cyclists and horse riders.

The Grade II* listed 17th-century manor house Baynham Hall is located in the hamlet of Michaelchurch-on-Arrow.

References

External links
Gladestry Community website
www.geograph.co.uk : photos of Gladestry and surrounding area

Villages in Powys